Festuca baffinensis also called the Baffin Island fescue is a species of grass in the Poaceae family. The name was published in Bulletin of the National Museum of Canada in 1940. The specific name 'baffinensis' was named after Baffin Island in canada. This species is native Subarctic Northern Hemisphere to W. Central U.S.A.

Characteristics 
Festuca baffinensis have culms that are 5 - 25 centimeteres long, that are densely pubescent or either pilose near the inflorense. The sheaths are close about half their length.

Habitat 
Festuca baffinensis is a perennial plant and mainly grows in temperate biomes or volcanic areas.

References

baffinensis